Huaning may refer to:

Huaning County, Yunnan, China
Huaning Road, Shanghai, China

See also
Typhoon Huaning (disambiguation)